Devon Walker (born November 29, 1990) is an American former college football player. He was playing at Tulane University when he was paralyzed from the neck down during a college game following a collision with a teammate. He signed a one-day contract with the New Orleans Saints in May 2014.

Background
Walker grew up in the New Orleans suburb of Destrehan and graduated from Destrehan High School. He attended Tulane University in New Orleans, where he graduated in May 2014 with a degree in cell and molecular biology.

Walker is now in pursuit of his Master’s degree in Neuroscience.

Injury
Walker was injured on September 8, 2012 during a game against Tulsa when he collided with a Tulane teammate and injured his C4 vertebrae. He was paralyzed from the neck down. He was a senior at Tulane at the time.

Signing
In May 2014, the New Orleans Saints surprised Walker when they signed him and welcomed him to their rookie minicamp. Devon was signed to a one-day NFL contract as an honorary member of the New Orleans Saints.

As coach Sean Payton said, “He is an outstanding young man, who is not only an inspiration to his coaches and teammates at Tulane, but to all of us. Devon’s character, determination, intelligence and work ethic are everything that we look for in a New Orleans Saint when we sign a player.”

References

1990 births
Living people
Players of American football from Louisiana
American football safeties
African-American players of American football
Tulane Green Wave football players
Destrehan High School alumni
People from Destrehan, Louisiana
New Orleans Saints players
21st-century African-American sportspeople